Trevor Gerard Moniz is a Portuguese-Bermudian politician who served as Attorney General and Minister of Legal Affairs in the Government of Bermuda from 2014 to 2017.

He attended Saltus Grammar School and studied law at King's College London on a Bermuda Government scholarship, graduating with an LLB in 1975. He was called to the Bar in England and Wales in 1976, and to the Bermuda Bar in 1977. He also attended the University of Toronto (Diploma in Business Administration). He was elected to the House of Assembly of Bermuda in 1993 and retired in August 2020.

References

Living people
Alumni of King's College London
Members of the House of Assembly of Bermuda
20th-century Bermudian lawyers
Bermudian people of Portuguese descent
Attorneys General of Bermuda
Year of birth missing (living people)
21st-century Bermudian lawyers